Korchinski is the surname of the following people
Bernard Leo Korchinski (1905-2006), Canadian politician in Saskatchewan
Stanley Korchinski (1929-2000), Canadian politician in Saskatchewan

Other
Death of Regis Korchinski-Paquet, Toronto Police case